Breed Obsession is the third studio album by Australian rock band Gyroscope, produced by Dave Eringa and released through Warner Music on 8 March 2008.

The album was recorded, mixed and produced in the United Kingdom. It was the second time Gyroscope had headed overseas to record, after working in Los Angeles on their previous album Are You Involved?, in 2005.

Breed Obsession debuted at number one on the Australian ARIA Albums Chart, making it the band's most commercially successful album. The album received further accolades when it was certified gold by ARIA in August 2008.

Recording 

The album was recorded at Elevator Studios in Liverpool with Dave Eringa (Idlewild, Manic Street Preachers), and mixed at Livingstone in London, United Kingdom. Zoran Trivic in an interview explaining why they recorded so far away from the home town of Perth:"We didn't really decide to travel afar purposely. We loved Dave Eringa's work [producer on Breed Obsession] for his previous records with Idlewild. His sounds are broad and varied and raw but still precise. He lives in London so we had to travel to work with him. And he was a godsend to tell you the truth. A great experience."

Singles 

The first single from the album, "Snakeskin", was released on 27 October 2007, debuting at No. 30 on the ARIA singles chart, was number-one most voted on JTV, number-one most requested song on Triple J's Super Request and was ranked No. 16 on Triple J's Hottest 100 for 2007. The "Snakeskin" video was shot in Wiltshire, near Stonehenge, south of London. The video sees the band playing in the middle of a 200-metre crop circle that was made specifically for the video, in the same farm where the Led Zeppelin crop circle was made that featured on the cover of the Remasters compilation album.
"Snakeskin" was featured in all Network 10 promotions for the 2008 AFL season. The song also won two WAMi Awards for 'Best Single' and 'Best Video'.

On 12 February 2008 the band released the second single from the album, "1981", which peaked at No. 67 on the ARIA singles chart.

The song "Australia" was released as the third single in July 2008. It reached No. 50 on the physical singles chart and No. 99 on the ARIA singles chart. The song was heralded as a potential hit and unofficial anthem, with Mushroom Records chief Michael Parisi saying "This is a new anthem. Massive, massive, massive." The song pays tribute to indigenous people, first settlers, Diggers and recent reconciliation efforts. Songwriter Daniel Sanders stating: "I wanted to express it for my own sake. So I could rejoice in what I love about this country. Each to their own, but this is simply one Australian talking to another about how blessed we are. It's not patriotic or waving flags. It's a song to be enjoyed with a beer. Cheers, Australia. Tip of the cap."

Reception

Track listing 

All songs written by Daniel Sanders, Rob Nassif, Brad Campbell, Zoran Trivic.

Chart performance

Weekly charts

Year-end charts

Release history

Personnel 

Gyroscope
 Daniel Sanders – Vocals, guitar
 Zoran Trivic – Guitar, Sequencer, piano sample on "Snakeskin"
 Brad Campbell – Bass guitar
 Rob Nassif – Drums, electronic drums on "1981"

Recording details
 Dave Eringa – producer

References

External links 
 JBHiFi interview

2008 albums
Gyroscope (band) albums
Albums produced by Dave Eringa
Albums recorded at Elevator Studios